Gobin may refer to:

Gobin de Reims, 13th-century poet-composer
Gabriel Gobin (1903–1998), Belgian film actor
John P. S. Gobin (1837–1910), American politician and Union Army officer during the Civil War
John Gobin (polo), American polo player
 
Gobin is also used by Hindu people of Indian descent in Trinidad and Tobago, Guyana, Suriname, other parts of the Caribbean, Fiji, South Africa, and Mauritius. It is derived from Govinda, and its variations Gobind, Gobinda, and Govind, which is another name for the Hindu deity Krishna and means lord of herdsmen. In India it is used as a first name, but many of the children of the indentured laborers in the aforementioned countries used their fathers' first name as their surname. People with the surname Gobin in this sense include:

Sewram Gobin (born 1983), Mauritian footballer of Indian descent
Soogee Gobin (1880-1952), matriarch of the Capildeo family in Trinidad and Tobago

Gobin is a word used in the North west of England to discribe in a friendly manner someone who has just done something the wrong way.

References

Indian surnames
Surnames of Indian origin
Hindustani-language surnames
Hindu surnames
Indo-Caribbean
Indo-Guyanese people
Indian diaspora in Fiji
Indian diaspora in Trinidad and Tobago
Indian diaspora in Suriname
Indian diaspora in South Africa
Indian diaspora in Mauritius